In mathematical finite group theory, an N-group is a group all of whose local subgroups (that is, the normalizers of nontrivial p-subgroups) are solvable groups. The non-solvable ones were classified by Thompson during his work on finding all the minimal finite simple groups.

Simple N-groups

The simple N-groups consist of the special linear groups PSL2(q), PSL3(3), the Suzuki groups Sz(22n+1),  the unitary group U3(3), the alternating group A7, the Mathieu group M11, and the Tits group. (The Tits group was overlooked in Thomson's original announcement in 1968, but Hearn pointed out that it was also a simple N-group.) More generally Thompson showed that any non-solvable N-group is a subgroup of Aut(G) containing G for some simple N-group G.

 generalized Thompson's theorem to the case of groups where all 2-local subgroups are solvable. The only extra simple groups that appear are the unitary groups U3(q).

Proof

 gives a summary of Thompson's classification of N-groups. 

The primes dividing the order of the group are divided into four classes π1, π2, π3, π4 as follows
π1 is the set of primes p such that a Sylow p-subgroup is nontrivial and cyclic.
π2 is the set of primes p such that a Sylow p-subgroup P is non-cyclic but SCN3(P) is empty
π3 is the set of primes p such that a Sylow p-subgroup P has SCN3(P) nonempty and normalizes a nontrivial abelian subgroup of order prime to p.
π4 is the set of primes p such that a Sylow p-subgroup P has SCN3(P) nonempty but does not normalize a nontrivial abelian subgroup of order prime to p.

The proof is subdivided into several cases depending on which of these four classes the prime 2 belongs to, and also on an integer e, which is the largest integer for which there is an elementary abelian subgroup of rank e normalized by a nontrivial 2-subgroup intersecting it trivially. 

 Gives a general introduction, stating the main theorem and proving many preliminary lemmas.
 characterizes the groups E2(3) and S4(3) (in Thompson's notation; these are the exceptional group G2(3) and the symplectic group Sp4(3)) which are not N-groups but whose characterizations are needed in the proof of the main theorem.
 covers the case where 2∉π4. Theorem 11.2 shows that if 2∈π2 then the group is PSL2(q), M11, A7, U3(3), or PSL3(3).  The possibility that 2∈π3 is ruled out by showing that any such group must be a C-group and using Suzuki's classification of C-groups to check that none of the groups found by Suzuki satisfy this condition.
 and  cover the cases when 2∈π4 and e≥3, or e=2. He shows that either G is a C-group so a Suzuki group, or satisfies his characterization of the groups E2(3) and S4(3) in his second paper, which are not N-groups.
 covers the case when 2∈π4 and e=1, where the only possibilities are that G is  a C-group or the Tits group.

Consequences
A minimal simple group is a non-cyclic simple group all of whose proper subgroups are solvable. 
The complete list of minimal finite simple groups is given as follows 
PSL2(2p), p a prime.
PSL2(3p), p an odd prime.
PSL2(p), p > 3 a prime congruent to 2 or 3 mod 5
Sz(2p), p an odd prime.
PSL3(3)

In other words a non-cyclic finite simple group must have a subquotient isomorphic to one of these groups.

References

Finite groups